Blanco is a census-designated place in San Juan County, New Mexico, United States. Its population was 388 as of the 2010 census. Blanco has a post office with ZIP code 87412, which opened on March 6, 1901. U.S. Route 64 passes through the community.

A parish was established in Blanco in 1900 with St. Rose of Lima Catholic Church being the mother church for many missions.

Demographics

Education 
The area school district is Bloomfield Schools. Bloomfield High School is the local high school.

References

Census-designated places in New Mexico
Census-designated places in San Juan County, New Mexico